The Picture of Dorian Gray (1915) is an American silent film based on the novel The Picture of Dorian Gray (1890) by Oscar Wilde. Approximately half an hour of the movie survived.

Plot summary

Cast
 Harris Gordon as Dorian Gray
 Helen Fulton as Evelyn
 Ernest Howard as Basil Hayward
 W. Ray Johnston as Lord Henry Wotton
 Morgan Jones
 Claude Cooper
 Arthur Bauer
 N. S. Woods (N. Z. Wood)

See also
 Adaptations of The Picture of Dorian Gray

References

External links
 
 
 Progressive Silent Film List: The Picture of Dorian Gray (1915) at silentera.com

1915 films
American silent short films
1915 drama films
Silent American drama films
Films based on The Picture of Dorian Gray
1915 short films
American black-and-white films
1910s American films
Silent horror films